Andrew "Andy" Dunne born 18 October 1979 in Castleknock Dublin, Ireland is a former professional rugby union player for Leinster Rugby, NEC Harlequins, Bath Rugby and Connacht. 
He retired in 2009 following a ten-year career. 
He was educated at Belvedere College in Dublin where he won Schoolboy International caps in both rugby and cricket. He progressed to a Commerce degree in UCD on a sports scholarship, winning a Colours match in 1999 playing with Brian O'Driscoll. He later returned to his home club by joining Old Belvedere RFC, where he won 2 Leinster Senior Cups, and three All Ireland League titles - Division 2 (2006/7), Division 1B (2009/10) and finally was captain for the Dublin 4 club's All Ireland triumph of 2011.

The flyhalf represented Ireland in the 2001 Rugby Sevens World Cup in Mar Del Plata in Argentina, scoring the tournament's fastest try (7 seconds).
In his first season of Premiership rugby in the UK the young Irish man won the Daily Telegraph Try of the Season. In the same season he went on to score the winning conversion in the 2004 European Challenge Cup vs Aurelien Rougerie's Clermont. 
His career did not progress significantly in the following years as expected due to a combination of injuries, club transfers and non selection.

He was a member of the 2008 Six Nations training squad and won two caps with the Ireland A team that season.

Retirement
Following knee surgery Dunne, retired in 2009 aged 29.

He qualified as a Chartered Physiotherapist soon afterwards and went on to work with Cricket Ireland in the 2014 Cricket World Cup in Bangladesh.

He is currently a member of the ISCP based in Dublin.

References

External links
Connacht profile
Leinster sign Le Roux and Gomez
Information for Andrew Dunne

1979 births
Living people
Rugby union fly-halves
Irish rugby union players
Leinster Rugby players
Connacht Rugby players
Bath Rugby players
Old Belvedere R.F.C. players
Ireland international rugby sevens players
Rugby union players from County Dublin
People educated at Belvedere College
Alumni of University College Dublin
Alumni of the Royal College of Surgeons in Ireland
People from Castleknock
Sportspeople from Fingal